The 2007-08 season was the 94th season in Aris Thessaloniki F.C.'s existence. The club finished 4th in the Super League's regular season and in the same place in play-offs. The club qualified in to the UEFA Cup of the next season.

Aris Thessaloniki was the finalist of Greek Football Cup where they lost by Olympiacos.

In Europe, Aris Thessaloniki eliminated in Group stage of UEFA Cup afte finished 4th in Group F.

The club hired Juan Carlos Oliva as its manager for that season. After the first game of the league Juan Carlos Oliva quit and replaced by Dušan Bajević for the rest of the season

First-team squad

Transfers and loans

Transfers in

Transfers out

Loans In

Competitions

Overall

Overview

{| class="wikitable" style="text-align: center"
|-
!rowspan=2|Competition
!colspan=8|Record
|-
!
!
!
!
!
!
!
!
|-
| Super League

|-
| Greek Cup

|-
| UEFA Cup

|-
! Total

{| class="wikitable" style="text-align: center"
|-
!rowspan=2|Super League 1
!colspan=8|Record
|-
!
!
!
!
!
!
!
!
|-
| Regular Season

|-
| Play-offs

|-
! Total

Managers' overview

Juan Carlos Oliva
{| class="wikitable" style="text-align: center"
|-
!rowspan=2|Competition
!colspan=8|Record
|-
!
!
!
!
!
!
!
!
|-
| Super League

|-
| Greek Cup

|-
| UEFA Cup

|-
! Total

Dušan Bajević
{| class="wikitable" style="text-align: center"
|-
!rowspan=2|Competition
!colspan=8|Record
|-
!
!
!
!
!
!
!
!
|-
| Super League

|-
| Greek Cup

|-
| UEFA Cup

|-
! Total

Super League

Regular season

League table

Results summary

Matches

Play-offs

League table

The teams started the play-offs with the following number of points:
AEK Athens – 8
Panathinaikos – 7
Aris Thessaloniki – 2
Panionios – 0

Results summary

Matches

Greek Football Cup

Fourth Round

Fifth Round

Quarter-finals

Semi-finals

Final

UEFA Cup

First round

Group stage

Group table

Matches

Squad statistics

Appearances

Players with no appearances not included in the list.

Goals

Clean sheets

References

  rsssf.com – Greece 2007/08
 slgr.gr – Team squad for the 2007–08 season
 slgr.gr – Players statistics for the 2007–08 season

External links

Greek football clubs 2007–08 season
2007-08